This is a list of historic sites in Connecticut that are administered by the Connecticut Department of Economic and Community Development's 
Historic Preservation Office.  The division fulfills a range of responsibilities in the field of historic preservation, including the operation of five historic sites owned by the state.

References

See also 
List of museums in Connecticut

Museums in Connecticut